The Belgian Women's Second Division is the third level women's football league of Belgium. It started in 1981-82.

Format
In the league's season, 12 teams participated, playing a double round-robin schedule to decide the champion.

2019-20 teams

Winners 
In the years 1991, 1994, and between 1998 and 2001 there were two leagues in Second Division and therefore two winners those years.

1982 V.C. Asse Ter Heide
1983 F.C. Féminin Gosselies
1984 V.V.D.G. Lommel
1985 DVV Brugge
1986 S.V. Terheide Asse
1987 V.V.D.G. Lommel
1988 Elen Standard
1989 Kam. Aalst
1990 V.V.D.G. Lommel
1991 Dames F.C. J. Nijlen (A) / KFC Rapide Wezemaal (B)
1992 DVK Egem
1993 Sinaai Girls
1994 DVK Gent (A) / Union Forest Dames (B)
1995 .S.V. Cercle Brugge
1996 DVK Haacht
1997 Helchteren V.V.
1998 DVK Haacht (A) / Standard Fémina de Braine (B)
1999 K.F.C. Lentezon Beerse (A)/ Miecroob Veltem (B)
2000 SK. Aalst (A) /  Ladies Willebroek (B)
2001 K.S.C. Eendracht Aalst (A) / SK Opex Girls Oostende (B)
2002 DVC Land Van Grimbergen
2003 Dames Zultse V.V.
2004 K.Vlimmeren Sport
2005 FC.Fémina W.S. Woluwe 
2006 DV Famkes Merkem
2007 K.Kontich FC.
2008 K.SV.Jabbeke
2009  Dames Zultse VV. A
2010 K.Kontich FC.
2011  KSK Heist Ladies
2012 Melle Ladies
2013 Standard Luik B
2014 Massenhoven VC

References

External links
women.soccerway.com - standings, results and fixtures

3
Third level women's association football leagues in Europe
Educational institutions established in 1982
1982 establishments in Belgium